Gogana is a genus of moths of the family Drepanidae. The genus was erected by Francis Walker in 1866. There are currently about 15 described species, all of which are found on Borneo, but some of which also have ranges in Sumatra and Peninsular Malaysia. The larvae feed on palms.

Species
Gogana abnormalis (found in Peninsular Malaysia and Sumatra)
food plants include Calamus manan
Gogana bornormalis
Gogana carnosa
Gogana cottrillii (found in Peninsular Malaysia)
Gogana conwayi
Gogana fragilis
Gogana integra (found in Peninsular Malaysia)
Gogana kerara (found in Peninsular Malaysia)
food plants include Daemonorops grandis, Orania macrocladus
Gogana ossicolor
Gogana semibrevis
food plants include Calamus nanus
Gogana specularis (found in Peninsular Malaysia)
Gogana streptoperoides
Gogana tenera (found in Peninsular Malaysia)
Gogana turbinifera

References

External links

Drepaninae
Drepanidae genera
Taxa named by Francis Walker (entomologist)